Tuguryuk (Tögörik) is a rural locality (a settlement) in Ust-Koksinsky District, the Altai Republic, Russia. The population was 334 as of 2016. There are 11 streets.

Geography 
Tuguryuk is located 20 km northwest of Ust-Koksa (the district's administrative centre) by road. Siny Yar is the nearest rural locality.

References 

Rural localities in Ust-Koksinsky District